Cardiff Gate services is the motorway service station on the junction of the M4 motorway (junction 30) and the A4232, located on the  Cardiff Gate International Business Park, adjacent to Pontprennau, north east of Cardiff, Wales. Originally leased by Granada Ltd., it is now owned by Welcome Break.

Gavin & Stacey

The services featured frequently in the BBC1 television series Gavin & Stacey, masquerading as Leigh Delamere services, which is actually located further east along the M4 in Wiltshire.

References

External links

 Welcome Break Motorway Services - Cardiff Gate services - M4 Motorway
 Cardiff Gate services - Motorway Services Online
 Cardiff Gate International Business Park (www.cardiffgate.com)

Welcome Break motorway service stations
M4 motorway service stations
Transport in Cardiff
Motorways in Wales